Asumoh Ete Ekukinam (born 1929) was Nigerian politician who served as the Finance Minister of the Federal Republic of Nigeria during the Nation's 2nd republic in 1976 and 1977.

Early life
Ekukinam was born 1929 in Ikot Epene in Akwa Ibom State.

Education
Ekukinam attended Methodist College, Uzoakali. He received further degrees degree from the Atlanta University, Georgia and the Wharton School of Finance, US.

Career
Ekukinam was director of research at the Central Bank of Nigeria from 1966–1972, and later vice-chairman and chairman of the social economic council to the governor of Southeastern state. Ekukinam was appointed the Minister of Finance replacing James Oluleye (1976–1977).

References

1929 births
Living people
Finance ministers of Nigeria
Atlanta University alumni
People from Akwa Ibom State
Nigerian economists